is a Japanese animated television series co-produced by Tsuburaya Production and Tokyo Broadcasting System and animated by Sunrise. The series aired on TBS Television affiliates on the Wednesday 7:00 PM time slot from April 4, 1979 to March 26, 1980, lasting a total of 50 episodes. It was the eighth installment in the Ultra Series and began airing four years after the end of Ultraman Leo.

The show was the first animated incarnation of Tsuburaya's iconic superhero Ultraman, as well as one of the earliest works of anime studio Nippon Sunrise (now known as Bandai Namco Filmworks), who also worked on their now-iconic mecha series Mobile Suit Gundam during the same year.

Story

In the 21st century, various mysterious events occur on Earth, causing monsters to appear all of a sudden. EGG3 officer Chouichirou Hikari was scouted to join the Science Defense Squad on Earth but while on his way back, he was bonded to Ultraman Jonias, an Ultra-Person of U-40 who was sent by his brethren to fight against the monster threats and alien invasions. This allows the youth to become an Ultraman against countless enemies while keeping his identity a secret from his fellow members. Almost in the middle of the series, both Hikari and Jonias lost their lives from fighting the Spirit Parasite. They were spirited to the Ultra Planet of U-40 by Elec, and discovered the Ultra People's connection to the Earth in the past. Hikari and Jonias were revived in said planet and helped foiled the invaders Badel People to reclaim the stolen Ultra-mind.

Starting from episode 28, Daisuke Gondo becomes a new captain to the SDS. Despite their rocky start, the team learn to accept him due to his great intuition and brotherly instinct. Amia would return to Earth to warn Hikari and the SDS of the invasion of Heller Empire, a renegade faction of Ultra People that invaded their home world and saw Earth as their next target due to Jonias's involvement. The Heller Empire was led by Heller, who was banished due to his misuse of the Ultra-mind for immortality. The SDS were given the Ultria, an ancient battleship made by the Ultra People to counter invasion attempts made by the Heller Army. In the four final episodes, Heller sent a full-scale invasion on Earth to wipe humanity after fearing that they would cooperate with the remaining Ultra People. The SDS disobeyed the Earth Self Defense Army to go into space, joining forces with the remaining U-40 resistances to form the U Fleet and attacked the Titan Base on Saturn to prevent more invasion forces from coming to Earth. On U-40, the SDS made a risky attempt to sneak into the Heller City to weaken its defense as the U Fleet attacked Heller's forces in the planet's outer atmosphere. When the SDS were about to be killed by Mac Datar, Hikari's secret was exposed to save his comrades before joining the remaining seven Ultras in foiling Heller's attempts to escape. With Amia and the Wiseman being rescued, Heller died in the ensuing explosion as U-40 celebrated their victory. Jonias finally separated from Hikari and spent several months to observe Earth with his sister Amia. Once assuring that peace had returned, they bid farewell to the SDS and promised to return when the Earth's safety is threatened once more.

Staff

English Dubbing Staff

Episodes

Songs

Theme Songs
Opening theme: "The Ultraman"
Song: Aku
Composition and Arrangement: Miyauchi Kunio
Song: Isao Sasaki and Columbia Yurikakai
Ending theme: "Brave men of love"
Lyrics: Aku 
Composition and Arrangement: Kunio Miyauchi
Songs: Isao Sasaki
This serves as the first case of an entry in the Ultra Series having an ending sequence. Performed by BGM staff who had previously composed the theme song for "Ultra Seven". Both songs were recorded in Los Angeles, as was the in-play music.

Insert Songs
"Ultraman Hymn"
Lyrics: Kazuho Mitsuda 
Composition and Arrangement: Toru Fuyuki 
Song: Isao Sasaki
Sasaki, who was in charge of the song, made it the most difficult song he had ever sung.
"Star of Ultra"
Lyrics: Tani Noboru 
Composition and Arrangement: Toru Fuyuki 
Song: Columbia Torigokai
"Song of Mutsumi"
Lyrics-Kazuho Mitsuda 
Composition: Noboru Tani 
Arrangement: Hiroshi Takada 
Song: Mitsuko Horie
"Super Murdoch"
Lyrics and Composition: Tani Noboru 
Arrangement: Hirotaka Takada 
Song: Isao Sasaki
"Our Science Garrison"
Lyrics: Kazuho Mitsuda 
Composition: Noboru Tani 
Arrangement: Hirotaka Takada 
Songs: Isao Sasaki
"Robot Pig's Song"
Lyrics: Noboru Tani 
Composition: Toru Fuoki 
Arrangement: Masahito Maruyama 
Song: Junpei Takiguchi
"Tomorrow ..."
Lyrics and Composition: Noboru Tani 
Arrangement: Hiroshi Takada
Song: Takashi Toyama
It was used in Episode 18, and in Episode 23, the instrument was used.
"Monster Requiem"
Lyrics: Kazuho Mitsuda 
Composition and Arrangement: Toru Fuyuki 
Songs: Isao Sasaki
In the 15th episode of the next series, Ultraman 80, Emi Johno was used in the scene singing a lullaby to the monster Mue and in 44 the instrument was used in the scene where 80 and the Delusion Ultra Seven fight. In addition, the "popular monster large parade" of "5 Nights Series Super TV" (March 26–30, 1984, Ultraman Taro, Mirrorman, Fireman, Jumborg Ace) digest version had been featured. It is also used as an ending.

English versions
In the United States, there have been two feature-length movie compilations: The Adventures of Ultraman (1981), and Ultraman II: The Further Adventures of Ultraman (1983). The Adventures of Ultraman was a feature-length film produced by Tsuburaya Productions specifically for the English-language market. The film is composed of edited footage from several episodes of the series. The storyline was rewritten for this adaptation with a new script by Jeff Segal and music composed by Mark McKinniss. Ultraman II was a dub of the first four episodes co-produced by Tsuburaya Productions and Associates Entertainment International. Despite the title, it has no continuity with the previous English dub of the series. Although the translation is closer to the original Japanese scripts than the first movie, the characters' names were still changed (although, the names given to the characters are not the same ones used in the previous dub). The order of the third and fourth episodes were also switched.

On April 5, 1980, episode 14 of The Ultraman aired on U.S. national television when New York superstation WOR-TV Channel 9 (now WWOR) aired it as the first part of "Japan Tonight!", a special seven-hour block of programming from TBS (Tokyo Broadcasting System), hosted by actor Telly Savalas. Japanese actress/author/talk show host Tetsuko Kuroyanagi introduced the episode surrounded by assorted Ultraman toys and merchandise while explaining to the American audience just who Ultraman is, "It's very, very popular in Japan - He's like your Superman". The episode was dubbed into English by William Ross (Frontier Enterprises) in Japan and was sponsored by Bandai America.

Home media
In 2018, the series was released on the streaming service Toku.

In July 2020, Shout! Factory announced to have struck a multi-year deal with Alliance Entertainment and Mill Creek, with the blessings of Tsuburaya and Indigo, that granted them the exclusive SVOD and AVOD digital rights to the Ultra series and films (1,100 TV episodes and 20 films) acquired by Mill Creek the previous year. The Ultraman, amongst other titles, will stream in the United States and Canada through Shout! Factory TV and Tokushoutsu.

It was released in the United States on DVD September 14, 2021 by Mill Creek Entertainment.

References

External links

The Ultraman at Anime News Network
Official website of Tsuburaya Productions 
Ultraman Connection — Official website 
Official Ultraman channel at YouTube

1979 anime television series debuts
Action anime and manga
Science fiction anime and manga
Sunrise (company)
TBS Television (Japan) original programming
Ultra television series
Extraterrestrials in anime and manga